Sarah Noll (born 5 October 1991) is a German bobsledder who has competed since 2011.

References

1991 births
Living people
German female bobsledders
21st-century German women